The American Electric was an American automobile manufactured in Chicago from 1899 to 1902 and Hoboken, New Jersey, in 1902. The company was incorporated by Clinton Edgar Woods in 1895 as American Electric Vehicle Co. Chicago, and merged with Indiana Bicycle Co. to become Waverly in 1898 and later Pope-Waverley.

Perhaps optimistically, the manufacturer claimed that "very few private carriages would ever be subjected to such a test". The company moved to New Jersey in 1902, according to a company statement, “to find more wealthy customers,” but they shutdown operations within the year.

See also
 History of the electric vehicle
 List of defunct United States automobile manufacturers

References 

Veteran vehicles
Defunct motor vehicle manufacturers of the United States
Electric vehicles introduced in the 19th century
Vehicle manufacturing companies established in 1899
American companies established in 1899
1899 establishments in Illinois
Motor vehicle manufacturers based in Illinois